Triple therapy may refer to :

 a first line therapy in Helicobacter pylori eradication protocols
 any of the three drug treatments used in Management of HIV/AIDS
 the combination of methotrexate, sulfasalazine, and hydroxychloroquine used to treat rheumatoid arthritis